Dorcaschema succineum is an extinct species of beetle in the family Cerambycidae. It was described by Zang in 1905. It existed during the Upper Eocene, and has been discovered within Baltic amber.

References

Dorcaschematini
Beetles described in 1905